Junta de Traslaloma is a municipality located in the province of Burgos, Castile and León, Spain. According to the 2004 census (INE), the municipality has a population of 200 inhabitants.

The Junta de Traslaloma is made up of nine towns: Castrobarto (seat or capital), Colina, Cubillos, Las Eras, Lastras de las Eras, Tabliega, Villalacre, Villatarás and Villaventín.

References 

Municipalities in the Province of Burgos